The 1973 European Cup Winners' Cup Final was the final football match of the 1972–73 European Cup Winners' Cup and the 13th European Cup Winners' Cup final. It was contested between Milan of Italy and Leeds United of England, and was held at Kaftanzoglio Stadium in Thessaloniki, Greece. Milan won the match 1–0 thanks to a goal by Luciano Chiarugi.

The Greek crowd at the final reacted to perceived bias towards Milan by referee Christos Michas by throwing missiles during the victors' lap of honour, but despite protests, the result was not overturned. UEFA later banned Michas for life due to match fixing, although his role in this match was not investigated.

Leeds, who perceived referee Christos Michas to have made a number of unfair decisions, attempted to gain a replay but UEFA denied the request. Decades later Richard Corbett, then MEP for Yorkshire and the Humber, petitioned UEFA for a revocation of the Milan title.

Route to the final

Match details

See also
1973 European Cup Final
1973 UEFA Cup Final
A.C. Milan in European football
Leeds United F.C. in European football

References

External links
UEFA Cup Winners' Cup results at Rec.Sport.Soccer Statistics Foundation
1973 European Cup Winners' Cup Final at UEFA.com

3
Cup Winners' Cup Final 1973
Cup Winners' Cup Final 1973
1973
UEFA Cup Winners' Cup Finals
UEFA
UEFA
May 1973 sports events in Europe
Sport in Thessaloniki